Process-centered design (PCD) is a design methodology, which proposes a business centric approach for designing user interfaces. Because of the multi-stage business analysis steps involved right from the beginning of the PCD life cycle, it is believed to achieve the highest levels of business-IT alignment that is possible through UI.

Purpose 
This method is aimed at enterprise applications where there is a business process involved. Unlike content oriented systems such as websites or portals, enterprise applications are built to enable a company's business processes. Enterprise applications often have a clear business goal and a set of specific objectives like- improve employee productivity, increase business performance by a certain percent, etc.

Comparison between other popular UI design methods 
Although there are proven UI design methodologies (like the most popular "user-centered design", which helps design highly Usable Interfaces), PCD differentiates itself by precisely catering to business process intensive software which has not been the case with other UI design methodologies.

Process-UI alignment 
Process-UI alignment is a component of PCD, which ensures tight alignment between the business process and the enterprise application being developed.  UI design activities are affected by PCD. 

For example: A call center software used by a customer support agent, if designed for high process-UI alignment will achieve tremendous agent productivity improvement and call center performance; which is not likely to be seen if it were designed only for user satisfaction, ease of use, etc.

See also 
 Business process
 Overall labor effectiveness
 User-centered design
 Figma resources
 Figma tutorials and resources
 Usability

References

External links 
 Align Journal, October 3, 2007, Retrieved on Aug 01, 2008. Process-User Interface Alignment: New Value From a New Level of Alignment
 More research exploring the relation between business process and user interfaces: ACM SAC 2008: Sousa, Mendonca, Vanderdonckt

Design
User interfaces
Usability
Business process
Information technology management
Software development process
Workflow technology